William Glyn (1504 – 21 May 1558), also known as William Glynn or William Glynne, was the Bishop of Bangor from 1555 until his death.

He was born in Heneglwys, Anglesey and educated at Queens' College, Cambridge, later becoming a fellow of that college and of Trinity.  He was elected President of Queens' College in 1553, Vice-Chancellor of Cambridge University in the following year, and Bishop of Bangor in 1555.

He had been pragmatic towards the religious changes of the Reformation but probably remained most sympathetic to Catholicism.

His brother Geoffrey Glyn had left property and money in his will in 1557 towards the founding of a grammar school in Bangor, which William Glyn and Maurice Griffith, Bishop of Rochester were intended to execute. Both these men were to die the following year before the intention could be executed, but ultimately Friars School, Bangor was set up.

References

Glyn Roberts in Welsh Biography Online

1504 births
1558 deaths
People from Anglesey
Alumni of Queens' College, Cambridge
Fellows of Queens' College, Cambridge
Presidents of Queens' College, Cambridge
Fellows of Trinity College, Cambridge
Vice-Chancellors of the University of Cambridge
Bishops of Bangor
16th-century Welsh clergy
Lady Margaret's Professors of Divinity